A Puerta Cerrada (English: Behind Closed Doors) is the first studio album by Spanish rock band Fito & Fitipaldis. It was produced by Iñaki "Uoho" Antón and Fito Cabrales, recorded and published by DRO in 1998.

Track listing

Chart performance

Certifications

References 

Spanish-language albums
1998 debut albums
Fito & Fitipaldis albums